The Tower of Calvi is a Genoese tower in the commune of Calvi (Haute-Corse) on the  Corsica.

The tower was one of a series of coastal defences built by the Republic of Genoa between 1530 and 1620 to stem the attacks by Barbary pirates.

In 1990 the tower together with the ramparts of the citadel were listed as one of the official historical monuments of France.

See also
List of Genoese towers in Corsica

Notes and references

Towers in Corsica
Monuments historiques of Corsica